Smolare Falls (Macedonian: Смоларски Водопад) is the tallest waterfall in the Republic of North Macedonia, falling from a height of 39.5 metres (129.5 feet).  It is located above the village of Smolare in the Municipality of Novo Selo in the southeastern region of the country.  

The waterfall is part of the Lomnica River and is located deep in Mount Belasica at an elevation of 630 metres. Crashing down the smooth, black rock face, and surrounded by 100-year-old beech trees, this waterfall is visited by tourists throughout the year.

External links
Information on Smolare Falls on the official website of the Municipality of Novo Selo
Tourist information on the Exploring Macedonia webpage

Waterfalls of North Macedonia
Novo Selo Municipality